Game drive may refer to:

 Game drive system, a hunting strategy
 Game drive (Wildlife tourism), viewing wildlife from a vehicle